Mark Kac (Polish: Marek Kac; August 3, 1914 – October 26, 1984) was a Polish American mathematician. His main interest was probability theory. His question, "Can one hear the shape of a drum?" set off research into spectral theory, the idea of understanding the extent to which the spectrum allows one to read back the geometry. (In the end, the answer was "no", in general.)

Biography
He was born to a Polish-Jewish family; their town, Kremenets (Polish: "Krzemieniec"), changed hands from the Russian Empire (by then Soviet Ukraine) to Poland after the Peace of Riga, when Kac was a child. 

Kac completed his Ph.D. in mathematics at the Polish University of Lwów in 1937 under the direction of Hugo Steinhaus. While there, he was a member of the Lwów School of Mathematics. After receiving his degree, he began to look for a position abroad, and in 1938 was granted a scholarship from the Parnas Foundation, which enabled him to go work in the United States. He arrived in New York City in November 1938.

With the onset of World War II in Europe, Kac was able to stay in America, while his parents and brother, who had remained in Kremenets, were murdered by the Germans in mass executions in August 1942.

From 1939 to 1961, Kac taught at Cornell University, first as an instructor, then from 1943 as an assistant professor and from 1947 as a full professor. While there, he became a naturalized US citizen in 1943. During the 1951–1952 academic year, Kac was on sabbatical at the Institute for Advanced Study. In 1952, Kac, with Theodore H. Berlin, introduced the spherical model of a ferromagnet (a variant of the Ising model) and, with J. C. Ward, found an exact solution of the Ising model using a combinatorial method. In 1961, Kac left Cornell and went to The Rockefeller University in New York City. In the early 1960s, he worked with George Uhlenbeck and P. C. Hemmer on the mathematics of a van der Waals gas. After twenty years at Rockefeller, he moved to the University of Southern California where he spent the rest of his career.

Work
In his 1966 article titled "Can one hear the shape of the drum", Kac asked the question whether two resonators ("drums") of different geometrical shapes can have exactly the same set of frequencies ("sound tones"). The answer was negative, meaning that the eigenfrequency set does not uniquely characterize the shape of a resonator.

Reminiscences

His definition of a profound truth. "A truth is a statement whose negation is false. A profound truth is a truth whose negation is also a profound truth." (Also attributed to Niels Bohr)
He preferred to work on results that were robust, meaning that they were true under many different assumptions and not the accidental consequence of a set of axioms.
Often Kac's "proofs" consisted of a series of worked examples that illustrated the important cases.
When Kac and Richard Feynman were both Cornell faculty, Kac attended a lecture of Feynman's and remarked that the two of them were working on the same thing from different directions. The Feynman–Kac formula resulted, which proves rigorously the real case of Feynman's path integrals. The complex case, which occurs when a particle's spin is included, is still unproven. Kac had taught himself about Wiener processes by reading Norbert Wiener's original papers, which were "the most difficult papers I have ever read." Brownian motion is a Wiener process. Feynman's path integrals are another example.
Kac's distinction between an "ordinary genius" like Hans Bethe and a "magician" like Richard Feynman has been widely quoted. (Bethe was also at Cornell University.)
Kac became interested in the occurrence of statistical independence without randomness. As an example of this, he gave a lecture on the average number of factors that a random integer has. This wasn't really random in the strictest sense of the word, because it refers to the average number of prime divisors of the integers up to N as N goes to infinity, which is predetermined. He could see that the answer was c log log N, if you assumed that the number of prime divisors of two numbers x and y were independent, but he was unable to provide a complete proof of independence. Paul Erdős was in the audience and soon finished the proof using sieve theory, and the result became known as the Erdős–Kac theorem. They continued working together and more or less created the subject of  probabilistic number theory.
Kac sent Erdős a list of his publications, and one of his papers contained the word "capacitor" in the title. Erdős wrote back to him "I pray for your soul."

Human rights concerns
For a number of years Kac was the co-chair of the Committee of Concerned Scientists. He was a co-author of a letter which publicized the case of the scientist Vladimir Samuilovich Kislik and a letter which publicized the case of the applied mathematician Yosif Begun.

Awards and honors
 1950 — Chauvenet Prize for 1947 expository article
 1959 – member of the American Academy of Arts and Sciences
 1965 – member of the National Academy of Sciences
 1968 – Chauvenet Prize (and 1967 Lester R. Ford Award) for 1966 expository article
 1969 – member of the American Philosophical Society
 1971 – Solvay Lecturer at Brussels
 1980 – Fermi Lecturer at the Scuola Normale, Pisa

Books
 Mark Kac and Stanislaw Ulam: Mathematics and Logic: Retrospect and Prospects, Praeger, New York (1968)  1992 Dover paperback reprint. 
 Mark Kac, Statistical Independence in Probability, Analysis and Number Theory, Carus Mathematical Monographs, Mathematical Association of America, 1959.
 Mark Kac, Probability and related topics in the physical sciences. 1959 (with contributions by Uhlenbeck on the Boltzmann equation, Hibbs on quantum mechanics, and van der Pol on finite difference analogues of the wave and potential equations, Boulder Seminar 1957).
 Mark Kac, Enigmas of Chance: An Autobiography, Harper and Row, New York, 1985. Sloan Foundation Series.  Published posthumously with a memoriam note by Gian-Carlo Rota.

References

External links

 
 
National Academy of Sciences Biographical Memoir

1914 births
1984 deaths
20th-century American mathematicians
Cornell University faculty
Institute for Advanced Study visiting scholars
Polish emigrants to the United States
Presidents of the Institute of Mathematical Statistics
Probability theorists
Lwów School of Mathematics
American people of Polish-Jewish descent
University of Southern California faculty
People with acquired American citizenship
People from Kremenets
Members of the American Philosophical Society